Bad English may refer to:

Music
 Bad English, an Anglo-American rock supergroup
 Bad English (album), 1989 debut album from the eponymous band

English language
 Broken English, certain forms of incorrect or ungrammatical use of the English language.
 English profanity, coarse/foul/bad language in English
 Vernacular English, as opposed to standardized or school English
 English slang, not proper English
 Mute English, English as a written/read unspoken language
 Non-native pronunciations of English
 Engrish bad English found in Asia
 Chinglish, bad English found in Asia

See also
 List of English-based pidgins
 English-based creole languages
 List of macaronic forms of English
 Broken English (disambiguation)